The canton of Châteauvillain is an administrative division of the Haute-Marne department, northeastern France. Its borders were modified at the French canton reorganisation which came into effect in March 2015. Its seat is in Châteauvillain.

It consists of the following communes:
 
Aizanville
Arc-en-Barrois
Aubepierre-sur-Aube
Autreville-sur-la-Renne
Blaisy
Blessonville
Braux-le-Châtel
Bricon
Bugnières
Châteauvillain
Cirfontaines-en-Azois
Colombey-les-Deux-Églises
Coupray
Cour-l'Évêque
Curmont
Dancevoir
Dinteville
Giey-sur-Aujon
Gillancourt
Juzennecourt
Lachapelle-en-Blaisy
Laferté-sur-Aube
Lanty-sur-Aube
Latrecey-Ormoy-sur-Aube
Lavilleneuve-au-Roi
Leffonds
Maranville
Montheries
Orges
Pont-la-Ville
Rennepont
Richebourg
Rizaucourt-Buchey
Silvarouvres
Vaudrémont
Villars-en-Azois
Villiers-sur-Suize

References

Cantons of Haute-Marne